Roxann Dawson (née Caballero, born September 11, 1958), also credited as Roxann Biggs and Roxann Biggs-Dawson, is an American actress and director. She is best known for her role as B'Elanna Torres on the television series Star Trek: Voyager (1995–2001). In the 2000s, she transitioned to a career primarily as a director, and has directed numerous episodes of television series including Star Trek: Enterprise, Crossing Jordan, Cold Case, Heroes, The Closer, The Mentalist, The Good Wife, Agents of S.H.I.E.L.D., Mercy Street, and The Deuce.

Early life
Roxann Dawson Caballero was born September 11, 1958 in Los Angeles, California. She graduated from University of California, Berkeley in 1980.

Career

Acting
Dawson's first professional acting job was in a Broadway production of A Chorus Line.

In 1989 Dawson worked on the NBC drama Nightingales. During the course of her work on that show, she met casting director Eric Dawson, who would later become her second husband. After the show was canceled, Eric's company cast her in guest roles on Matlock and Jake and the Fat Man.

In 1994, Dawson was cast as the half Human/half-Klingon engineer B'Elanna Torres on Star Trek: Voyager. She was a main cast member for all seven seasons of the show. 

Her other television credits include appearances on The Hat Squad, Baywatch, The Closer, Matlock, The Untouchables, Any Day Now, Without a Trace, The Lyon's Den, The Division, the U.S. version of Coupling and the science fiction television series Seven Days.

Directing and producing 
While working on Voyager, Dawson made her directorial debut on the episode "Riddles", which aired in September 1999. She later directed the second part of the two-part episode "Workforce" and directed 10 episodes of Star Trek: Enterprise. In 2002, she provided the voice of the repair station computer in one of the Star Trek: Enterprise episodes she directed.

Dawson has also directed episodes of Charmed, The O.C., Close to Home, Lost, Heroes, Hawthorne, The Closer, Cold Case, Caprica, The Mentalist and Treme. In 2010, she directed the season two episode "Teacher and Pupils" of Lie to Me and the season two episode "On Tap" of The Good Wife. In 2013, she directed the March 22 episode "Reunions" of Touch, and the October 15 episode "Eye-Spy" of Agents of S.H.I.E.L.D..

In 2014 she directed the March 5 episode "Dreamcatcher" of Revolution and the October 22 episode "Phobia" of Stalker. For the 2015 season of the Amazon Video series Bosch, she directed "Chapter Six: Donkey's Years"). She directed early episodes of Mercy Street, a series released on PBS in January 2016. In 2016, she also directed the season one episodes "Broussard" and "Zero Day" of the TV series Colony. She's also directed the episode "Crossbreed" of season five of The Americans. She also directed episode 8 ("Chapter 60") of the fifth season of House of Cards.

Dawson was a producer on Scandal, Crossing Jordan and Cold Case.

Writing
Dawson's first play Desire to Fall was produced by the Circle Repertory Company workshop in 1986. Dawson's second play, Passage Through the Heart debuted in 1997 at the University of Minnesota Duluth. From 2000 to 2001, Dawson co-wrote with Daniel Graham a trilogy of science fiction novels, Entering Tenebrea, Tenebrea's Hope and Tenebrea Rising.

Personal life
Dawson was married to actor Casey Biggs, but they eventually divorced. He later became a recurring cast member on the sister series Star Trek: Deep Space Nine, playing the Cardassian Damar.

In May 1994 Dawson married casting director Eric Dawson, whom she met while working on the series Nightingales. They have two daughters, Emma and Mia; Mia was adopted from China. Dawson joined the Catholic Church at the time of her second marriage in 1994, despite having been raised in "an atheist household". This eventually inspired her to direct the 2019 Christian film Breakthrough.

Filmography

Acting credits

Film

Television series

Video games

Documentaries

Audiobooks

Theatre

Directing credits

Film

Television

Writing credits

Awards and nominations

See also
 List of female film and television directors

References

External links

 
 
 
 

1958 births
Living people
20th-century American actresses
21st-century American actresses
Actresses from Los Angeles
American film actresses
American people of Latin American descent
American stage actresses
American television actresses
American television directors
American Roman Catholics
Converts to Roman Catholicism from atheism or agnosticism
Hispanic and Latino American actresses
Television producers from California
University of California, Berkeley alumni
American women television directors
American women television producers